James Borsa the Bald (12601325/1332), was an influential lord in the Kingdom of Hungary at the turn of the 13th and 14th centuries. He was Palatine between 1306 and 1314,  Ban of Slavonia in 1298, and Master of the horse between 1284 and 1285.

References

Sources 

Bans of Slavonia
Palatines of Hungary
Oligarchs of the Kingdom of Hungary
James
13th-century Hungarian people
14th-century Hungarian people
Masters of the horse (Kingdom of Hungary)